Svetlana Yuryevna Koroleva (born 1983) is a Russian model and beauty pageant titleholder who was crowned Miss Russia 2002 in June 2002, while competing with 69 other contestants from various regions of Russia. During the pageant, she represented her home city of Petrozavodsk.
The same year she represented Russia at Miss Europe 2002 pageant and won.

Koroleva entered the technical school for municipal services, where she studied water supply and drainage systems .

She is a mother of 3 kids.

References

Living people
Russian female models
Miss Europe winners
Miss Russia winners
1983 births
Russian twins
20th-century Russian women
21st-century Russian women